Christian Social Party of Peru (in Spanish: Partido Social Cristiano del Perú) was a political party in Peru founded in 1946. Víctor Cárcamo was the president of the organizing committee.

See Christian Social Party (Peru)

1946 establishments in Peru
Christian political parties
Defunct political parties in Peru
Political parties established in 1946
Political parties with year of disestablishment missing